Charles Gifford Dyer (29 December 1851, in Chicago, Illinois – 26 January 1912, in Munich, Germany) was an American painter, known mostly for his architectural scenes of Venice and Greece.

Biography
He was born to Dr. Charles Volney Dyer, who was originally from Vermont, worked for the Chicago section of the "Underground Railroad" and was a close friend of Abraham Lincoln. His exact date of birth is unknown, due to the loss of documents in the Great Chicago Fire.

After his primary education, he attended and graduated from the Naval Academy Preparatory School in Newport, Rhode Island. He served briefly in the Civil War, but had to resign for health reasons. He would spend most of his career in Germany, except for extended visits to Rome, Venice, and the Middle East. He continued to exhibit in the United States, notably at the National Academy of Design (1875) and the Boston Art Club (1883).

He and his wife, Mary Anthony Dyer, were part of an expatriate community of American artists which included their friend, John Singer Sargent, who painted a portrait of her during one of their visits to Venice; now in the collection of the Art Institute of Chicago. Their daughter, Stella, was a piano prodigy but at the age of seven she moved to the violin and performed throughout Europe as a young woman.

He was an art professor in Munich at the time of his death.  His cremated remains were returned to America and interred in the Dyer family plot at the Oakwoods Cemetery in Chicago, Illinois. A series of thirty paintings of the ruins of Greece, commissioned by J. Pierpont Morgan, were left uncompleted.

References

External links

19th-century births
1912 deaths
19th-century American painters
Academy of Fine Arts, Munich alumni
American emigrants to Germany
20th-century American painters